Ladies' Man is a 1947 American comedy film directed by William D. Russell and written by Edmund Beloin, Jack Rose and Lewis Meltzer. The film stars Eddie Bracken, Cass Daley, Virginia Welles, Spike Jones, Johnny Coy and Virginia Field. The film was released on February 7, 1947, by Paramount Pictures.

Plot

Cast 
Eddie Bracken as Henry Haskell
Cass Daley as Geraldine Ryan
Virginia Welles as Jean Mitchell
Spike Jones as Spike Jones 
Johnny Coy as Johnny O'Connor
Virginia Field as Gladys Hayden
Lewis Russell as David Harmon 
Georges Renavent as Mr. Jones
Roberta Jonay as Miss Miller
Gordon Richards as Mr. Bolton
The City Slickers as Spike Jones' Band

Reception
A. W. of The New York Times said, "Whatever may be one's opinion about Ladies Man, it cannot be said that Eddie Bracken, its star, is miscast. For this singularly simple little item from Paramount, which began a stand at the Gotham on Saturday, makes full use of Mr. Bracken's cherubic appearance. As a bumpkin from Badger, Okla., who suddenly becomes an oil millionaire and comes to New York for the inevitable fling, Mr. Bracken is to the manner born. He is a reluctant Romeo—shy, gullible and frustrated. But the ensuing yarn about his involvements with a radio program and several predatory females, is corn from the bottom of the crib. The chuckles in this comedy are widely spaced and hardly keep pace with its tedium."

References

External links 
 

1947 films
1947 comedy films
American black-and-white films
American comedy films
Films directed by William D. Russell
Paramount Pictures films
1940s English-language films
1940s American films